Barratt Hall, also known as the Philip Barratt House, is a historic home located near Frederica, Kent County, Delaware.  It dates to the mid-18th century, and is a two-story, three bay, center-hall plan brick dwelling in the Georgian-style.  In 1784, Bishops Thomas Coke and Francis Asbury met in the house with Mrs. Miriam Barratt and eleven preachers. They held council here which ended in sending Freeborn Garrettson to summon preachers to the Christmas Conference in Baltimore, Maryland, at which the Methodist Church in America was organized.  It was the home of Philip Barratt, who donated land and, together with Waitman Sipple, erected Barratt's Chapel in 1780.

It was listed on the National Register of Historic Places in 1973.

References

Houses completed in 1784
History of Methodism in the United States
Houses on the National Register of Historic Places in Delaware
Georgian architecture in Delaware
Houses in Kent County, Delaware
National Register of Historic Places in Kent County, Delaware